Numerous figures in German culture and history (some still living) were either born, resident, or spent a substantial part of their lives in the former eastern territories of Germany. A non-exhaustive list follows:

Politicians, statesmen and diplomats

18th century
 Catherine the Great (1729 in Stettin – 1796 in Saint Petersburg) was Empress of Russia from 1762 to 1796, the country's longest-ruling female leader
 Friedrich Leopold Freiherr von Schrötter (1743 in Friedland – 1815 in Berlin) a German Junker, Prussian government minister and until 1806 Reichsfreiherr of the Holy Roman Empire
 Friedrich von Gentz (1764 in Breslau – 1832 in Vienna) a German diplomat and writer, friend of Fanny Elssler

19th century

 Ferdinand Lassalle (1825 in Breslau – 1864 in Carouge) a German-Jewish jurist, philosopher, socialist and political activist, initiated international-style socialism in Germany
 Adalbert Falk (1827 in Metschkau – 1900 in Hamm) was a German politician and lawyer
 Eduard Lasker (1829 in Jarotschin – 1884 New York, United States) a German politician and jurist, inspired by the French Revolution, he became a spokesman for liberalism
 Leo von Caprivi (1831 in Berlin – 1899 in Skyren) an Imperial German Army general, served as Chancellor of Germany from 1890 to 1894
 Philipp, Prince of Eulenburg (1847 in Königsberg – 1921 in Liebenberg, Löwenberger Land) a diplomat and composer, close friend of Wilhelm II. He fell from power in 1907 due to the Harden–Eulenburg affair when he was accused of homosexuality.
 Elard von Oldenburg-Januschau (1855 in Beisleiden - 1937 in Marienwerder) was a German Junker and conservative German National People's Party politician
 Georg Michaelis (1857 in Haynau – 1936 in Bad Saarow) was Chancellor of Germany for a few months in 1917
 Augusta Victoria of Schleswig-Holstein (1858 in Dolzig Palace – 1921 in Huis Doorn, Netherlands) was the last German empress and queen of Prussia by marriage to Wilhelm II, German Emperor
 Walther von Lüttwitz (1859 in Bodland – 1942 in Breslau) a German general who fought in World War I, driving force behind the Kapp-Lüttwitz Putsch of 1920
 Karl Max, Prince Lichnowsky (1860 in Kreuzenort – Kuchelna 1928) was a German diplomat who served as Ambassador to Britain during the July Crisis in 1914
 Arthur Zimmermann (1864 in Marggrabowa – 1940 in Berlin) was State Secretary for Foreign Affairs of the German Empire from 22 November 1916/17, author of the intercepted and decoded Zimmermann Telegram
 Frederick Augustus III of Saxony (1865 in Dresden – 1932 in Sibyllenort) was the last King of Saxony (1904–1918) and a member of the House of Wettin
 Paul Hensel (1867 in Gehsen – 1944 in Kolberg) a German Lutheran theologian and politician, champion of the Masurians
 Otto Landsberg (1869 in Rybnick – 1957 in Baam, Netherlands) a German jurist, politician and diplomat, went to Versailles to receive Treaty of Versailles
 Gustav Bauer (1870 in Darkehmen – 1944 in Berlin) was a German Social Democratic Party leader and 11th Chancellor of Germany 1919 to 1920
 Wilhelm Pieck  (1876 in eastern Guben – 1960 in East Berlin) German Communist Party politician, first President of the German Democratic Republic in 1949
 Reinhold Wulle (1882 in Falkenberg – 1950 in Gronau) a German journalist, anti-Semite and Völkisch politician

20th century

 Helmuth James Graf von Moltke (1907 in Kreisau – executed 1945) a German jurist, founder member of the Kreisau Circle
 Herbert Hupka (1915-2006) raised in Ratibor was a German-Jewish journalist, politician and advocate for the Germans expelled from neighbouring countries after World War II
 Hans Modrow  (born 1928 in Jasenitz) a German politician, best known as the last Chairman of the Council of Ministers of East Germany
 Manfred Stolpe (born 1936 in Stettin) was Federal Minister of Transport in the Federal Republic of Germany 2002/05
 Egon Krenz (born 1937 in Kolberg) a former East German politician who was the last President of East Germany in 1989
 Prince Franz Wilhelm of Prussia (born 1943 in Grünberg) is businessman and member of the House of Hohenzollern

Military figures

Historical
 Gebhard Leberecht von Blücher (1742 in Rostock – 1819 in Krieblowitz) a Prussian Army Generalfeldmarschall and co-victor over Napoleon at the Battle of Waterloo
 Johann David Ludwig Graf Yorck von Wartenburg (1759 in Potsdam – 1830 in Klein Öls) a Prussian Generalfeldmarschall influential in securing an alliance between Prussia and Russia during the War of the Sixth Coalition
 Hermann von Boyen (1771 in Kreuzburg – 15 February 1848) a Prussian army officer and minister of war of Prussia

Army

 Colmar Freiherr von der Goltz (1843 in Adlig Bielkenfeld – 1916 in Baghdad) a Prussian Field Marshal and military advisor to the Ottoman Army
 Kuno von Moltke (1847 in Neustrelitz – 1923 in Breslau) adjutant to Kaiser Wilhelm II and military commander of Berlin, was a principal in the homosexual scandal known as the Harden-Eulenburg Affair
 Paul von Hindenburg (1847 in Posen – 1934 in Neudeck) a German field-marshal in WWI and President of the German Reich in 1925 to 1934
 Hermann von Eichhorn (1848 in Breslau – 1918 in Kiev) was a Prussian officer, later Generalfeldmarschall during WWI
 Max von Gallwitz (1852 in Breslau – 1937 in Naples) a German general who served with distinction during WW1
 Fritz von Below (1853 in Danzig – 1918 in Weimar) a Prussian general in the German Army during WW1.
 Otto Liman von Sanders (1855 Stolp – 1929 in Munich) German general, adviser and military commander to the Ottoman Army
 Erich von Falkenhayn (1861 in Burg Belchau – 1922 in Potsdam) the Chief of the German General Staff in WWI 1914 to 1916 
 Hans Feige (1880 in Königsberg – 1953 in Bad Schussenried) was a German General of the Infantry in the Wehrmacht in WWII
 Günther von Kluge (1882 in Posen – 1944 in Metz) a German field marshal during WWII
 Erich Fellgiebel (1886 in Pöpelwitz– executed 1944 in Berlin) a German Army general and a conspirator in the 20 July plot
 Heinz Guderian (1888 in Kulm – 1954 in Schwangau) a German general during WWII, the innovator and proponent of the blitzkrieg
 Walter Nehring (1892 in Stretzin – 1983) a German general in the Wehrmacht during WWII who commanded the Afrika Korps.
 Dietrich von Saucken (1892 in Fischhausen – 1980 in Pullach) a general in the Wehrmacht during WWII 
 Hyacinth Graf Strachwitz (1893 in Gross Stein – 1968 in Trostberg) a German Army officer of aristocratic descent, served in WWI and WWII
 Hermann Balck (1893 in Danzig – 1982 in Asperg) a decorated officer of the German Army who served in both WWI and WWII 
 Dietrich von Choltitz (1894 in Gräflich Wiese – 1966 in Baden-Baden) a German General, last military governor of Paris in WWII
 Walter Schilling (1895 in Chełmo – 1943 in Izium) a German general during WWII
 Heinrich Freiherr von Lüttwitz (1896 Krumpach – 1969 in Neuburg) a Prussian Junker, Olympic equestrian and German officer who served in both World Wars
 Friedrich von Mellenthin (1904 in Breslau – 1997 in Johannesburg) a German general during WWII
 Rochus Misch (1917 in Alt-Schalkowitz – 2013 in Berlin) last surviving occupant of the Führerbunker

SS
 Felix Steiner (1896 in Stallupönen – 1966 in Munich) an Obergruppenführer in the Waffen-SS during WWII
 Kurt Daluege (1897 in Kreuzburg – executed 1946 in Prague) Deputy Protector for the Protectorate of Bohemia and Moravia
 Erich von dem Bach-Zelewski (1899 in Lauenburg – 1972 in Munich) in 1944 he led the brutal suppression of the Warsaw Uprising
 Werner Ostendorff (1903 in Königsberg - 1945 in Bad Aussee) was a German SS-general in WWII, served as chief of staff of the II SS Panzer Corps

Air Force

 Walther Wever (1887 in Wilhelmsort – 1936 in Dresden) a pre-WWII Luftwaffe Commander, proponent of strategic bombing
 Kurt Student (1890 in Birkholz – 1978 in Lemgo) a German Fallschirmjäger general in the Luftwaffe during WWII
 Manfred von Richthofen (1892 in Breslau – 1918 near Vaux-sur-Somme), also known as the Red Baron, was a fighter pilot with the German Air Force during WWI, considered the ace-of-aces with 80 air combat victories.
 Kurt Wintgens (1894 Neustadt in Oberschlesien – 1916 in Villers-Carbonnel) was a German WWI fighter ace
 Max Näther (1899 Lauenbrunn – 1919 in Kolmar in Posen) a German WWI ace fighter pilot, probably the youngest
 Melitta Schenk Gräfin von Stauffenberg (1903 in Krotoschin – 1945 in Straubing) an aviatrix who served as a test pilot in the Luftwaffe in WWII
 Rudolf Schoenert (1911 in Glogau – 1985 in Manitoba) night fighter flying ace in the German Luftwaffe during WWII
 Hanna Reitsch (1912 in Hirschberge – 1979 in Frankfurt a/M) Germany's most famous female aviator and test pilot
 Hans-Jürgen Stumpff (1889 in Kolberg - 1968 in Frankfurt am Main) a German air forces general who signed the unconditional surrender in 1945
 Günther Radusch (1912 in Schwetz – 1988 in Nordstrand) a German pilot in the German Luftwaffe during WWII
 Wolf-Dietrich Wilcke (1913 in Schrimm – 1944 in Schöppenstedt) a German Luftwaffe pilot during WWII and fighter ace 
 Hans-Ulrich Rudel (1916 in Konradswaldau – 1982 in Rosenheim) a German ground-attack pilot during WWII and prominent neo-Nazi activist in Latin America
 Helmut Lent (1918 Pyrehne – 1944 in Paderborn) a German night-fighter ace in WWII.
 Joachim Müncheberg (1918 in Friedrichsdorf – 1943 in Tunisia) a German Luftwaffe military aviator during WWII and fighter ace 
 Gerhard Barkhorn (1919 in Königsberg – 1983 in Frechen) the second most successful fighter ace
 Walter Krupinski (1920 in Domnau – 2000 in Neunkirchen-Seelscheid) a Bundeswehr general and a fighter pilot in the Luftwaffe in WWII
 Paul Zorner (1920 in Roben – 2014 in Homburg) a German night fighter pilot, who fought in the Luftwaffe in WW II
 Wolfgang Martini (1891 in Lissa - 1963 in Düsseldorf), Luftwaffe officer, promoted the use of radar in the German Air Force

Espionage
 Renate von Natzmer (1898 in Borkow – beheaded 1935 in Berlin) German noblewoman who worked for Polish intelligence
 Max Otto Koischwitz (1902 – 1944) a naturalized American of German origin who broadcast Nazi propaganda during WWII
 Wolfgang Vogel (1925 in Wilhelmsthal – 2008 in Schliersee) East German lawyer, brokered spy exchanges during the Cold War

Scientists and mathematicians

 Ehrenfried Walther von Tschirnhaus (1651 in Kieslingswalde – 1708 in Dresden) a German mathematician, physicist, physician, and philosopher
 Friedrich Wilhelm von Reden (1752 in Hamelin - 1815 in Schloss Buchwald), mining engineer and government official who contributed to the industrialisation of Silesia
 Karl Godulla (1781 in Makoschau - 1848 in Breslau) industrialist, the "King of Zinc", industrialised Silesia
 Heinrich Göppert (1800 in Sprottau – 1884 in Breslau) a German botanist, paleontologist and paleobotanist
 Ferdinand Schichau (1814 in Elbing – 1896 in Elbing) a German mechanical engineer and businessman
 Hermann Brehmer (1826 in Strehlen – 1889 in Görbersdorf) a German physician who established the first German sanatorium  for the systematic open-air treatment of tuberculosis in Görbersdorf
 Ferdinand Cohn (1828 in Breslau – 1898) a German biologist, one of the founders of modern bacteriology and microbiology.
 Ferdinand von Richthofen (1833 in Bad Carlsruhe in O.S – 1905 in Berlin) better known in English as Baron von Richthofen, was a German traveller, geographer, and scientist.
 Paul Ehrlich  (1854 in Strehlen – 1915 in Bad Homburg) a German Jewish physician and scientist who worked on hematology, immunology, and antimicrobial chemotherapy
 Paul Gottlieb Nipkow (1860 in Lauenburg in Pommern – 1940 in Berlin) was a German technician and inventor of the Nipkow disk 
 David Hilbert (1862 in Wehlau – 1943 in Göttingen) was a German mathematician, developed invariant theory and the axiomatization of geometry
 Hugo Münsterberg (1863 in Danzig – 1916 USA) a German-American psychologist, pioneer in applied psychology
 Johannes Thienemann (1863 – 1938 in Rossitten) a German ornithologist who in 1901 established the Rossitten Bird Observatory, the world's first, on the Curonian Spit
 Alois Alzheimer (1864–1915 in Breslau) a German psychiatrist and neuropathologist, identified "presenile dementia", later called Alzheimer's disease 
 Walther Nernst (1864 in Briesen – 1941 in Zibelle) a German chemist, worked on thermodynamics, won the 1920 Nobel Prize in Chemistry
 Emil Krebs (1867 in Freiburg in Schlesien – 1930 in Berlin) a German polyglot and sinologist
 Fritz Haber (1868 in Breslau – 1934 in Basel) a German chemist, won the Nobel Prize in Chemistry in 1918 for his invention of the Haber–Bosch process
 Georg von Arco (1869 in Großgorschütz – 1940 in Berlin) a German physicist, radio pioneer and joint founder of Telefunken
 Max Born (1882 in Breslau – 1970 in Göttingen) a German physicist and mathematician who was instrumental in the development of quantum mechanics
 Edward Sapir (1884 in Lauenburg – 1939 USA) a Prussian-American anthropologist-linguist, important figure in linguistics
 Gerhard Domagk (1895 in Lagow – 1964 in Burgberg) a German pathologist and bacteriologist, discovered the first commercially available antibiotic (Prontosil) and received the 1939 Nobel Prize in Physiology or Medicine
 Maria Goeppert-Mayer (1906 in Kattowitz – 1972 USA) a German-born American theoretical physicist, won the 1963 Nobel Prize in Physics for proposing the nuclear shell model of the atomic nucleus
 Wernher von Braun (1912 in Wirsitz – 1977 USA) a German, later American, aerospace engineer and space architect, invented the V-2 rocket for Nazi Germany and the Saturn V for the United States
 Günter Blobel (born 1936 in Waltersdorf) a Silesian German biologist and winner of the 1999 Nobel Prize in Physiology
 Klaus Clusius (1903 in Breslau - 1963 in Zürich), physical chemist who worked on Germany's abortive nuclear weapon project

Philosophers and theologians
 George of Polentz (1478 - 1550 in Burg Balga) was  the first Lutheran bishop
 Immanuel Kant (1724 in Königsberg – 1804 in Königsberg) a German philosopher and a central figure in the Enlightenment and modern philosophy
 Johann Georg Hamann (1730 in Königsberg – 1788 in Münster) a German philosopher, theologian and philologist
 Johann Gottfried Herder (1744 in Mohrungen – 1803 in Weimar) was a German philosopher, theologian, poet, and literary critic
 Arthur Schopenhauer (1788 in Danzig – 1860 in Frankfurt) a German philosopher, an atheistic metaphysical and ethical pessimist
 Friedrich Daniel Ernst Schleiermacher (1768 Breslau – 1834 in Berlin) a German theologian, philosopher and biblical scholar known for developing field of hermeneutics
 Karl Gützlaff (1803 at Pyritz – 1851 in Hong Kong) a German Lutheran missionary to the Far East
 Paul Hensel (1860 in Groß-Barthen near Königsberg – 1930 in Erlangen) a German philosopher and professor at the University of Heidelberg
 Dietrich Bonhoeffer (1906 in Breslau– in 1945 Flossenbürg) was a German Confessing Church pastor, theologian, spy and anti-Nazi dissident
 Paul Tillich (1886 in Starzeddel - 1965 in Chicago), German-American philosopher and theologian

Historians and archaeologists
 Heinrich Graetz (1817 in Xions – 1891 in Munich) an historian, wrote a history of the Jewish people from a Jewish perspective.
 Gottfried Bernhardy (1800 in Landsberg an der Warthe – 1875) German philologist and literary historian
 Ferdinand von Roemer (1818 – 1891) geologist, he formed a mineralogy collection in the Museum at Breslau 
 Arthur Milchhöfer (1852 in Schirwindt – 1903) was a German archaeologist  
 Otto Jaekel (1863 in Neusalz – 1929 in Beijing) was a German paleontologist and geologist.
 Fritz Gause (1893 – 1973) German historian, archivist and curator wrote a three-volume history of Königsberg
 Bolko von Richthofen (1899 in Mertschütz – 1983) German archaeologist
 Theodor Schieder (1908 – 1984) German historian, moved to Königsberg in 1934 at the age of 26
 Walter Bruno Henning (1908 in Ragnit – 1967 USA) a German scholar of Middle Iranian languages and literature

Musicians

Classical

 Georg Riedel (1676 - in Königsberg - 1738 in Königsberg) was a German composer and cantor. He has been referred to as the "East Prussian Bach"
 Sylvius Leopold Weiss (1687 in Grottkau – 1750 in Dresden) a German composer and lutenist.
 Johann Friedrich Reichardt (1752 in Königsberg – 1814 in Giebichenstein near Halle) a German composer, writer and music critic.
 Franz von Oppersdorff (1778 in Oberglogau - 1818) a Silesian nobleman and a great lover of music, who commissioned Beethoven's Fourth and Fifth Symphonies
 Johann Sedlatzek (1789 in Oberglogau – 1866 in Vienna) a Silesian flautist born into a family of tailors
 Carl Loewe  (1796 in Löbejün – 1869 in Kiel) a German composer, tenor singer and conductor, worked in Stettin for 46 years 
 Otto Nicolai (1810 in Königsberg – 1849 in Berlin) a German composer, conductor and founder of the Vienna Philharmonic 
 Johann Gottfried Piefke (1817 in Schwerin an der Warthe – 1884 in Frankfurt an der Oder) a German conductor, Kapellmeister and composer of military music
 Wilhelm Joseph von Wasielewski (1822 in Groß-Leesen – 1896 in Sondershausen) a German violinist, conductor and musicologist
 Philipp Scharwenka (1847 in Samter – 1917 in Bad Nauheim) a German composer and teacher of music
 Sir George Henschel (1850 in Breslau – 1934 in Aviemore) a German-born British baritone, pianist, conductor and composer
 Xaver Scharwenka (1850 in Samter – 1924 in Berlin) a German pianist, composer and teacher of Bohemian-Polish descent
 Franz Eckert (1852 in Neurode - 1916 in Keijo, Japanese Korea), arranged the melody of Kimigayo, the Japanese national anthem
 Moritz Moszkowski (1854 in Breslau – 1925 in Paris) a German-Jewish composer, pianist and teacher
 Richard Wetz (1875 in Gleiwitz – 1935 in Erfurt) a German late Romantic composer best known for his three symphonies
 Otto Klemperer (1885 in Breslau – 1973 in Zurich) a German-born conductor and composer, widely regarded as one of the leading conductors of the 20th century
 Dame Elisabeth Schwarzkopf DBE (1915 in Jarotschin – 2006 in Schruns) a German soprano,  amongst the foremost singers of lieder and was renowned for her performances of Viennese operetta; one of the greatest sopranos of the 20th Century
 Kurt Masur (1927 in Brieg – 2015 USA) a German conductor, Kapellmeister of the Gewandhaus, and music director of the New York Philharmonic

Modern

Kurt Demmler (1943–2009), songwriter; accused of sexual abuse he hanged himself in his jail cell.
 John Kay (born 1944 in Tilsit is a German-Canadian rock singer, songwriter and guitarist known as the frontman of Steppenwolf
 Edgar Froese (1944 in Tilsit – 2015 in Vienna) a German artist and electronic music pioneer, founded the electronic music group Tangerine Dream
 Alexandra (1942 in Heydekrug - 1969), singer
 Oskar Gottlieb Blarr (born 1934 in Sandlack), organist and composer

Poets, writers and dramatists

Poets
 Martin Opitz von Boberfeld (1597 in Bunzlau – 1639 in Danzig) a German poet, seen as the greatest of the nation in his lifetime
 Friedrich von Logau (1605 in Brockut – 1655 in Liegnitz) a German poet and epigrammatist of the Baroque era.
 Andreas Gryphius (1616 in Glogau – 1664 in Glogau) a German lyric poet and dramatist
 Angelus Silesius  (c.1624 in Breslau – 1677 in Breslau) a German Catholic priest, physician, mystic and religious poet. 
 Ewald Christian von Kleist (1715 in Groß-Poplow – 1759 in Frankfurt (Oder)) a German poet and cavalry officer
 Max von Schenkendorf (1783 in Tilsit – 1817 in Koblenz) a German poet educated at Königsberg and writer of patriotic songs. 
 Joseph Freiherr von Eichendorff (1788 in Ratibor – 1857 in Neiße) a Prussian poet, novelist, playwright and literary critic

Writers
 E. T. A. Hoffmann  (1776 in Königsberg – 1822 in Berlin) a Prussian Romantic author of fantasy and Gothic horror, a jurist, composer, music critic, draftsman and caricaturist
 Bogumil Goltz (1801–1870) a German humorist and satirist, schooled in Marienwerder and Königsberg, lived in Gollub
 Gustav Freytag (1816 in Kreuzburg – 1895 in Wiesbaden) a German novelist and playwright.
 Gerhart Hauptmann  (1862 in Ober Salzbrunn – 1946 in Agnetendorf) a German dramatist and novelist. He received the Nobel Prize in Literature in 1912.
 Alfred Döblin  (1878 in Stettin – 1957 in Emmendingen) a German novelist, essayist, and doctor
 Arnold Zweig (1887 in Glogau – 1968 in East Berlin) a German writer and anti-war and antifascist activist
 Marion Dönhoff (1909 in Schloss Friedrichstein – 2002) a German journalist who worked over 55 years for the Hamburg-based, weekly newspaper Die Zeit, as an editor and later publisher.
 Siegfried Lenz (1926 in Lyck – 2014 in Hamburg) a German writer of novels, short stories and essays
 Günter Grass (1927 in Danzig – 2015 in Lübeck) a German novelist, poet, playwright, illustrator, graphic artist, sculptor, and recipient of the Nobel Prize in Literature in 1999
 Janosch, (born 1931 in Hindenburg) is one of the best-known German children's book authors and illustrators

Painters and visual artists
 Michael Willmann (1630 in Königsberg – 1706 in Leubus) a German painter and Baroque artist, "the Silesian Rembrandt"
 Karl Friedrich Lessing (1808 in Breslau - 1880 in Karlsruhe) a German historical and landscape painter
 Adolph Menzel (1815 in Breslau – 1905 in Berlin) a German Realist artist noted for drawings, etchings, and paintings.
 Lovis Corinth (1858 in Tapiau – 17 July 1925 in Zandvoort) a German artist and writer, he realized a synthesis of impressionism and expressionism.
 Käthe Kollwitz (1867 in Königsberg – 1945 in Moritzburg) a German artist, who worked with painting, printmaking and sculpture.
 Alfred Partikel (1888 in Goldap - date of death unknown) a German artist

Architects
 Georg Wenzeslaus von Knobelsdorff (1699 in Kuckädel – 1753 in Berlin) designed Berlin's Sanssouci Palace
 Carl Gotthard Langhans (1732 in Landeshut – 1808 in Grüneiche)  designer of the Brandenburg Gate
 Carl Ferdinand Langhans (1782 in Breslau – 1869 in Berlin) built among others the Breslau Opera
 Max Berg (1870 in Stettin – 1947 in Baden-Baden) was  designer of the Centennial Hall in Breslau
 Friedrich Lahrs (1880 in Königsberg – 1964 in Stuttgart) designed the Kunsthalle Königsberg (completed 1913) in Tragheim
 Richard Konwiarz (1883 in Karlshausen – 1960 in Hanover) designed the Silesian Arena, now the Olympic Stadium in Wrocław
 Erich Mendelsohn (1887 in Allenstein) – 1953 in San Francisco) was a Jewish German architect, known for his expressionist architecture in the 1920s
 Hanns Hopp (1890 in Lübeck - 1971 in East Berlin) lived in Königsberg and designed many public and private buildings there
 Bruno Taut (1880 in Königsberg - 1938 in İstanbul)

Film, TV, and theatre

 Robert Wiene (1873 in Breslau – 1938 in Paris) a film director of the German silent cinema of expressionist films 
 Hans Heinrich von Twardowski (1898 in Stettin – 1958 in New York) was a German film actor 
 Armin Mueller-Stahl (born 1930 in Tilsit) is a German film actor, painter and author, lives in Los Angeles
 Marianne Hold (1933 in Johannisburg – 1994 in Lugano) was a German movie actress, popular in the 1950s and 1960s 
 Veruschka von Lehndorff (born 1939 in Königsberg) a German model, actress, and artist, popular in the 1960s 
 Matthias Habich (born 1940 in Danzig) is a German actor, lives in Paris 
 Volker Lechtenbrink (born 1944 in Cranz) is a German television actor and singer 
 Ulli Lommel (born 1944 in Zielenzig - 2017) a German actor and director, collaborated with Rainer Werner Fassbinder
 Agnes Sorma (born 1862 in Breslau - 1927 in Arizona), stage actress

Miscellaneous

 Sophie Ursinus  (1760 in Glatz – 1836 in Glatz) serial killer
 Karl Denke (1860  in Münsterberg – 1924 in Münsterberg) a notorious cannibalistic serial killer in Silesia
 Emanuel Lasker (1868 in Berlinchen – 1941 USA) was a German chess player, mathematician, and philosopher
 Herbert Meinhard Mühlpfordt (1893 in Königsberg – 1982 in Lübeck) a German internist, art historian, and cultural historian.
 Sir Ludwig Guttmann CBE FRS (1899 in Tost – 1980 in Aylesbury) founder of the Paralympic Games
 Paul Mross (1910 in Bismarckhütte – 1991 in Düsseldorf) was a Polish–German chess master
 Herta Heuwer (1913 in Königsberg – 1999 in Berlin)  inventor of the currywurst
 Beate Uhse-Rotermund (1919 in Cranz – 2001 in St Gallen) aviator and founder of the world's first sex shop, Beate Uhse AG
 Hardy Rodenstock (1941 in Marienwerder - 2018 Oberaudorf) publisher, wine connoisseur and suspected wine fraudster
 Manfred Schaefer (1943 in Pillau), footballer

See also
 List of people from Breslau
 List of people born in the Free City of Danzig
 List of people from Königsberg
 List of people from Stettin

References

Former eastern territories of Germany
Lists of East German people